is a first-person horror video game developed for the iPhone by Chunsoft, a developer based in Shinjuku, Japan.

Gameplay
The game relies on sound feedback to inform the player about two entities on the map; the exit and a cursed doll. The player's goal is to make it to the outside by following the exit's sound, before the cursed doll can catch up with them. The player moves one tile at a time in any of four directions (left, right, forward, or turn backward) and is periodically updated with both sounds to distinguish the location of the goal and the doll. Each time the player moves one tile, the doll also moves one tile. The doll is able to move without depending on the player's movement if the player doesn't move for a long time. If the doll notice the player, the doll will move twice its original speed. The game is over when the doll succeeds in approaching the player. While escaping, players are required to hide at the same time to avoid the doll noticing the player.

External links
 Official website 

2010 video games
IOS games
IOS-only games
Horror video games
Video games developed in Japan